Antes Que O Mundo Acabe is a 2009 Brazilian film by director Ana Luiza Azevedo. It premiered at the Take 3 Dawn Breakers International Film Festival in Zurich, and was released worldwide in 2010.

External links
 
Dawn Breakers Festival listing

2009 films
Brazilian drama films
Best Picture APCA Award winners
2000s Portuguese-language films